Gabriele Zange ( Schönbrunn, born 1 June 1961) is a retired East German speed skater who specialized in the long distances (3000 m and 5000 m), winning three Olympic bronze medals in these events in 1984 and 1988. In 1981 she won a European bronze medal in the 3000 m and later set a world record at the high-altitude rink of Medeo (3000 m, 4:21.70). In 1984, she won European championships, setting two world records, in the 5000 m (7:39.44) and allround, and finished third at the world championships. Next year she won a silver at the world championships, but then had no success until the 1987–88 season, when she set her fourth world record (4:14.76 in the 3000 m) and won two Olympics medals. She retired soon after the 1988 Olympics and worked as a physiotherapist.

Personal bests: 
500 m – 41:93 (1981)
1000 m – 1:22.00 (1988)
1500 m – 2:04.98 (1988)
3000 m – 4:16.76 (1988)
5000 m – 7:21.61 (1988)

References

1961 births
Living people
German female speed skaters
Speed skaters at the 1984 Winter Olympics
Speed skaters at the 1988 Winter Olympics
Olympic speed skaters of East Germany
Medalists at the 1984 Winter Olympics
Medalists at the 1988 Winter Olympics
Olympic medalists in speed skating
Olympic bronze medalists for East Germany
World record setters in speed skating
People from Crimmitschau
World Allround Speed Skating Championships medalists
Sportspeople from Saxony